ELW may refer to:

 Eltham railway station, London, National Rail station code
 Evangelical Lutheran Worship, a guidebook for use in the Evangelical Lutheran Church in America
 Equity-Linked Warrant, a financial instrument otherwise known as a covered warrant